Bruce Cabot (born Étienne de Pelissier Bujac Jr.; April 20, 1904 – May 3, 1972) was an American film actor, best remembered as Jack Driscoll in King Kong (1933) and for his roles in films such as The Last of the Mohicans (1936), Fritz Lang's Fury (1936), and the Western Dodge City (1939). He was also known as one of "Wayne's Regulars", appearing in a number of John Wayne films beginning with Angel and the Badman (1947), and concluding with Big Jake (1971).

Early life
Cabot was born in Carlsbad, New Mexico, to a prominent local lawyer, Major Étienne de Pelissier Bujac Sr. and Julia Armandine Graves, who died shortly after giving birth to her son. Étienne Sr. was the son of John James Bujac, a lawyer and mining expert in Baltimore, Maryland.  Étienne Sr. graduated from Cumberland School of Law near Nashville, Tennessee, and served in the United States Army during the Spanish–American War (before he was born?) and the Philippine–American War before settling in Carlsbad.

Cabot graduated from Sewanee Military Academy in 1921, and briefly attended the University of the South in Sewanee, Tennessee, but left without graduating.

He worked at many jobs, including as a sailor, an insurance salesman, oil worker, surveyor, and prize fighter; he also sold cars, managed real estate, and worked at a slaughterhouse. A meeting with David O. Selznick at a Hollywood party led to his acting career. He claimed that he auditioned by acting out a scene from the play Chicago. The audition went "rather awful" in his opinion, but it did lead to him being cast in The Roadhouse Murder (1932).

Acting career

Early roles
Cabot appeared in nearly 100 feature films. He made his debut in an uncredited bit part in an episode of the serial Heroes of the Flames (1931). In Ann Vickers (1933), he portrays a soldier who seduces a naive woman (Irene Dunne), and gets her pregnant before he leaves for the war. He then appeared in King Kong (also 1933), which became an enormous success and established Cabot as a star.

He also portrays villains in several productions, appearing as a gangster boss in Let 'Em Have It (1935) and as the Huron warrior Magua opposite Randolph Scott in The Last of the Mohicans (1936). He co-stars with Spencer Tracy in Fritz Lang's first Hollywood film, Fury (1936), playing the leader of a lynch mob. He also appears with Errol Flynn in Michael Curtiz's epic Western Dodge City, which in 1939 was one of Warner Bros.'s biggest hits.

He tested for the lead role of the Ringo Kid in John Ford's Stagecoach (1939), but John Wayne was cast in the part. A consistent box-office draw, Cabot appeared in many movies at many studios before leaving Hollywood to serve in World War II.

War service and return to Hollywood
Cabot enlisted in December 1942 and, after Officer Training School in Miami Beach, was commissioned a first lieutenant in the U.S. Army Air Force.

Cabot headed back to Hollywood and fell in with John Wayne on the set of Angel and the Badman (1947), and became part of Wayne's circle, this relationship paying off in the 1960s, when Wayne cast him in 10 more of his films: The Comancheros (1961), Hatari! (1962), McLintock! (1963), In Harm's Way (1965), The War Wagon (1967), The Green Berets (1968),  Hellfighters (1968), The Undefeated (1969), Chisum (1970), and Big Jake (1971).

In 1965, he played the sheriff in the comedy western Cat Ballou.

Cabot's final screen appearance is in the James Bond film Diamonds Are Forever (1971).

He was inducted into the New Mexico Entertainment Hall of Fame in 2012.

Television
Cabot starred in a number of the Tales of Tomorrow, a science-fiction drama, during its second season (1952–53) on ABC.

He also appeared on other television series, such as:
Burke's Law - "Who Killed Holly Howard?" - Thomas Matherson (1963)
Bonanza - "A Dime's Worth of Glory" - Sheriff Reed Larrimore (1964)
Daniel Boone - "The Devil's Four" - Simon Bullard (1965)

Personal life
Cabot was married three times, in Florida to Mary Mather Smith,  whom he divorced prior to moving to Hollywood, and to actresses Adrienne Ames and Francesca De Scaffa (1930-1994).

He was one of Errol Flynn's social pack for several years, but they fell out during the production of the unfinished The Story of William Tell in the mid-1950s. Flynn was producing the film and asked Cabot, whom he described as "an old, old pal," to appear in it, knowing that Cabot was having difficulty finding work in Hollywood at that time. When Flynn's production partners went broke, though, production on the film halted, leaving Flynn stranded in Rome facing financial ruin. Cabot, in an attempt to get paid when other cast members were working for no money, had court officials seize Flynn's and co-producer Barry Mahon's personal cars and their wives' clothing from their hotel rooms.

In 1955, Bruce Cabot sued Flynn in a London court for unpaid salary of £17,357 ($48,599.60) saying he had been promised four weeks' work on the film but did not get it. Flynn wrote angrily in his autobiography of what he termed Cabot's "betrayal".  David Niven, also part of Flynn's social pack, in his autobiography accused Cabot of being missing when debts were to be paid.

Death
Cabot died May 3, 1972, at age 68 in the Motion Picture Country Home at Woodland Hills, California due to lung cancer. He was buried in his hometown of Carlsbad, New Mexico.

Filmography

Heroes of the Flames (1931, Serial) as Bit Part [ch.7] (film debut, uncredited)
Confessions of a Co-Ed (1931) as Student at Dance (uncredited)
Lady with a Past (1932) as Party Guest (uncredited)
The Roadhouse Murder (1932) as Fred Dykes
The Lost Special (1932, Serial) as Forest Ranger (uncredited)
Lucky Devils (1933) as Happy White
The Great Jasper (1933) as Roger McGowd (adult)
King Kong (1933) as Jack Driscoll
Scarlet River (1933) as Himself (uncredited)
Disgraced! (1933) as Kirk Undwood Jr.
Flying Devils (1933) as 'Ace' Murray
Midshipman Jack (1933) as Jack Austin
Ann Vickers (1933) as Capt. Lafayette Resnick
Shadows of Sing Sing (1933) as Bob Martel
Finishing School (1934) as Ralph McFarland - intern
Murder on the Blackboard (1934) as Addison 'Ad' Stevens
His Greatest Gamble (1934) as Stephen
Their Big Moment (1934) as Lane Franklyn
Redhead (1934) as Ted Brown
Men of the Night (1934) as Det. Sgt. 'Stake-Out' Kelly 
Night Alarm (1934) as Hal Ashby
Without Children  (1935) as Davd F. Cole
Let 'Em Have It (1935) as Joe Keefer
Show Them No Mercy! (1935) as Pitch
Don't Gamble with Love (1936) as Jerry Edwards
The Robin Hood of El Dorado (1936) as Bill Warren
The Three Wise Guys (1936) as Blackie
Fury (1936) as Kirby Dawson
The Last of the Mohicans (1936) as Magua  
Don't Turn 'Em Loose (1936) as Robert Webster - Alias Bat Williams
The Big Game (1936) as Cal Calhoun
Legion of Terror (1936) as Frank Marshall
Sinner Take All (1936) as Ernie
Bad Guys (1937) as 'Lucky' Walden
Love Takes Flight (1937) as Neil 'Brad' Bradshaw
The Bad Man of Brimstone (1937) as 'Blackjack' McCreedy
Sinners in Paradise (1938) as Robert Malone
Smashing the Rackets (1938) as Steve Lawrence
Tenth Avenue Kid (1938) as Jim 'Silk' Loomis
Homicide Bureau (1939) (lead with Rita Hayworth) as Jim Logan
Mystery of the White Room (1939) as Dr. Bob Clayton
Dodge City (1939) as Jeff Surrett
Mickey the Kid (1939) as Jim Larch/Jim Adams
Traitor Spy (1939) as Carl Beyersdorf/Ted Healey
My Son Is Guilty (1939) as Ritzy Kerry
Susan and God (1940) as Michael
Captain Caution (1940) as Slade
Girls Under 21 (1940) as Smiley Ryan
The Flame of New Orleans (1941) as Robert LaTour 
Sundown (1941) as William Crawford
Wild Bill Hickok Rides (1942) as Wild Bill Hickok
Pierre of the Plains (1942) as 'Jap' Durkin
Silver Queen (1942) as Gerald Forsythe
The Desert Song (1943) as Colonel Fontaine
Salty O'Rourke (1945) as Doc Baxter
Divorce (1945) as Bob Phillips
Fallen Angel (1945) as Dave Atkins
Smoky (1946) as Frank Denton
Avalanche (1946) as Steve Batchellor
Angel and the Badman (1947) as Laredo Stevens 
Gunfighters (1947) as Bard Macks
The Gallant Legion (1948) as Beau Laroux
Sorrowful Jones (1949) as Big Steve Holloway
Rock Island Trail (1950) as Kirby Morrow
Fancy Pants (1950) as Cart Belknap
Best of the Badmen (1951) as Cole Younger
Kid Monk Baroni (1952) as Mr. Hellman
Lost in Alaska (1952) as Jake Stillman
The Story of William Tell (1953) as Captain Jost
The Red Cloak (1955) as Capitano Raniero d'Anversa
Rommel's Treasure (1955) as Welles
Totò, lascia o raddoppia? (1956) as Nick Molise
The Quiet American (1958) as Bill Granger
The Love Specialist (1958) as Mike
The Sheriff of Fractured Jaw (1958) as Jack
Guardatele ma non toccatele (1959) as Collonnello Joe Charleston
John Paul Jones (1959) as Gunner Lowrie 
Goliath and the Barbarians (1959) as Alboino
The Comancheros (1961) as Maj. Henry 
Hatari! (1962) as Little Wolf aka The Indian
McLintock! (1963) as Ben Sage 
Law of the Lawless (1964) as Joe Rile
In Harm's Way (1965) as Quartermaster Quoddy 
Black Spurs (1965) as Bill Henderson
Cat Ballou (1965) as Sheriff Maledon
Town Tamer (1965) as Riley Condor
Choque de Sentimentos (1965)
The Chase (1966) as Sol
The War Wagon (1967) as Franklin Pierce 
The Green Berets (1968) as Colonel Morgan 
Hellfighters (1968) as Joe Horn 
The Undefeated (1969) as Jeff Newby
Chisum (1970) as Sheriff Brady 
WUSA (1970) as King Wolyoe
Big Jake (1971) as Sam Sharpnose 
Diamonds Are Forever (1971) as Bert Saxby (final film role)

References

External links

1904 births
1972 deaths
American male film actors
Male Western (genre) film actors
American male television actors
Male actors from New Mexico
People from Carlsbad, New Mexico
Deaths from lung cancer in California
20th-century American male actors
RKO Pictures contract players